20β-Dihydroprogesterone (20β-DHP), also known as 20β-hydroxyprogesterone (20β-OHP), is an endogenous metabolite of progesterone which is formed by 20β-hydroxysteroid dehydrogenase (20β-HSD). It is a progestogen similarly to progesterone, with about 20 to 50% of the progestogenic activity of progesterone. It can be converted by 20β-HSD into progesterone in the uterus. The effects of 20β-HSD on the uterus, mammary glands, and in maintaining pregnancy have been studied. The progestogenic activity of 20β-HSD has also been characterized in women.

See also
 20α-Dihydroprogesterone
 17α-Hydroxyprogesterone
 16α-Hydroxyprogesterone
 5α-Dihydroprogesterone
 11-Deoxycorticosterone

References

Secondary alcohols
Human metabolites
Enones
Pregnanes
Progestogens
Steroid hormones